Millettia richardiana is a species of plant in the family Fabaceae. It is found only in Madagascar.

References

richardiana
Endemic flora of Madagascar
Least concern plants
Taxonomy articles created by Polbot
Taxa named by Henri Ernest Baillon